Yanitzia Canetti (born 1967 in Havana City, Cuba) is a Cuban-American author, translator, editor, and professor who lives in Boston, Massachusetts.

As an author, Canetti has published over 500 books in various genres, including novels (Al otro lado, La vida es color de Rosa), poetry (Eva recién nacida, Entre la espada y la pared, Augurios, señales y otras profecías), short stories (La muerte nuestra de cada vida), essays, theatre, and children's books published by Seix Barral, Everest, Edebé, Houghton Mifflin, Scholastic, Pearson, McGraw-Hill, Reycraft Books, among other publishing houses. Her books have been translated into English, Italian, Portuguese, Croatian, Bulgarian, Romanian, Chinese, and other languages. She has also translated many well-known children's stories into Spanish, including The Berenstain Bears Save Christmas, Curious George Rides a Bike, and a number of books by Dr. Seuss. Canetti has earned a bachelor's degree in journalism, a master's degree in linguistics, and a Ph.D. in literature. Canetti has received several awards for her work, including the National Literature Award (Ministry of Education, Cuba) 1984, 1985, 1986; the White Rose Literature Award (Best Literature of the Year, Cuba) 1994; and Honorable Mention (National Association of Hispanic Publications, California) 1997. People Magazine (Spanish edition) selected her as one of the “25 Most Powerful Hispanic Women of the World”, with Sofia Vergara, Jennifer Lopez, Salma Hayek, and influential Hispanic women. She currently resides with her two sons in Boston, Massachusetts, United States.

Bibliography

Original works

Some works published
 Canetti, Y. (2015). Eva recién nacida (poetry). Lawrence, United States: Cambridge BrickHouse: CBH Books
 AA. VV. (1998,2014). Relatos de mujeres 3. Madrid, Spain: Editorial Popular
 Canetti, Y. (2012). Entre la espada y la pared (poetry). Lawrence, Massachusetts: United States: CBH Books
 Canetti, Y. (2012). Augurios, señales y profecías (poetry). Lawrence, Massachusetts: United States: CBH Books
 Canetti, Y. (2010). La vida es color de Rosa(novel). Andover, Massachusetts: Cambridge BrickHouse
 Canetti, Y. (2009). La muerte nuestra de cada vida (narrative). Andover, Massachusetts: Cambridge BrickHouse
 AA. VV. (2007). Relato Por el libro. Leon, Spain: Editorial Everest
 Canetti, Y. (2000). Al otro lado (novel). Barcelona, Spain: Planeta de Agostini, (1997). Al otro lado (novel). Barcelona: Seix Barral
 Canetti, Y. (1998). Novelita Rosa (novel). Boston: Versal Group

Children's books and educational books published
 Canetti, Y. (2008). ¡A comer!. New York, United States: Macmillan/McGraw-Hill 
 Canetti, Y. (2008). ¡A jugar!. New York, United States: Macmillan/McGraw-Hill
 Canetti, Y. (2008). ¡A recoger rápido!. New York, United States: Macmillan/McGraw-Hill
 Canetti, Y. (2018). ¡A ver quién gana!. Groveport, Ohio, United States: Benchmark Education
 Canetti, Y. (2015). ¡Brumm, brumm! Poemas acerca de cosas con ruedas. Huntington Beach, California, United States: Teacher Created Materials
 Canetti, Y. (2008). ¡Cómo crecemos!. New York, United States: Macmillan/McGraw-Hill
 Canetti, Y. (2014). ¡Cómo saben las familias!. North Andover, United States: BrickHouse Education
 Canetti, Y. (2014). ¡Cómo saben las mamás y los papás!. North Andover, United States: BrickHouse Education
 Canetti, Y. (2014). ¡Cómo saben los amigos!. North Andover, United States: BrickHouse Education
 Canetti, Y. (2014). ¡Cómo saben los bebés!. North Andover, United States: BrickHouse Education
 Canetti, Y. (2008). ¡De prisa!.  New York, United States: Macmillan/McGraw-Hill
 Canetti, Y. (2008). ¡De prisa! ¡De prisa!. New York, United States: Macmillan/McGraw-Hill
 Canetti, Y. (2008). ¡Dibuja así!.  New York, United States: Macmillan/McGraw-Hill
 Canetti, Y. (2008). ¡Es hora de bailar!. New York, United States: Macmillan/McGraw-Hill
 Canetti, Y. (2008). ¡Es Yuyo!. New York, United States: Macmillan/McGraw-Hill
 Canetti, Y. (2018). ¡Lola está contenta!. Groveport, Ohio, United States: Benchmark Education
 Canetti, Y. (2008). ¡Manos a la obra!. New York, United States: Macmillan/McGraw-Hill
 Canetti, Y. (2016). ¡Míralas! Destrezas de lectura': Claves de la ilustración (Picture's Clues). North Andover, United States: BrickHouse Education
 Canetti, Y. (2016). ¡Míralas! Destrezas de lectura: Comparar y contrastar (Compare and Contrast). North Andover, United States: BrickHouse Education
 Canetti, Y. (2016). ¡Míralas! Destrezas de lectura: Fantasía y realidad (Fantasy and Reality). North Andover, United States: BrickHouse Education
 Canetti, Y. (2016). ¡Míralas! Destrezas de lectura: Ficción y no ficción (Fiction and Non-fiction). North Andover, United States: BrickHouse Education
 Canetti, Y. (2016). ¡Míralas! Destrezas de lectura: Hacer inferencias (Make Inferences). North Andover, United States: BrickHouse Education
 Canetti, Y. (2016). ¡Míralas! Destrezas de lectura: Hacer predicciones (Make Predictions). North Andover, United States: BrickHouse Education
 Canetti, Y. (2016). ¡Míralas! Destrezas de lectura: Hacerse preguntas (Ask Questions). North Andover, United States: BrickHouse Education
 Canetti, Y. (2016). ¡Míralas! Destrezas de lectura: Hecho y opinión (Fact and Opinion). North Andover, United States: BrickHouse Education
 Canetti, Y. (2016). ¡Míralas! Destrezas de lectura: Idea principal y detalles (Main Idea and Details). North Andover, United States: BrickHouse Education
 Canetti, Y. (2016). ¡Míralas! Destrezas de lectura: Personajes principales (Main Characters). North Andover, United States: BrickHouse Education
 Canetti, Y. (2016). ¡Míralas! Destrezas de lectura: Sacar conclusiones (Draw Conclusions). North Andover, United States: BrickHouse Education
 Canetti, Y. (2016). ¡Míralas! Destrezas de lectura: Secuencia (Sequence). North Andover, United States: BrickHouse Education
 Canetti, Y. (2008). ¡No, Minino, no!. New York, United States: Macmillan/McGraw-Hill
 Canetti, Y. (2008). ¡Puedo saltar!. New York, United States: Macmillan/McGraw-Hill
 Canetti, Y. (2008). ¡Qué amables son todos!. New York, United States: Macmillan/McGraw-Hill
 Canetti, Y. (2008). ¡Qué bonita foto!. New York, United States: Macmillan/McGraw-Hill
 Canetti, Y. (2008). ¡Qué clima tan loco!. New York, United States: Macmillan/McGraw-Hill
 Canetti, Y. (2008). ¡Qué desorden!. New York, United States: Macmillan/McGraw-Hill
 Canetti, Y. (2008). ¡Qué día!. New York, United States: Macmillan/McGraw-Hill
 Canetti, Y. (2008). ¡Qué estupendo es volar!. New York, United States: Macmillan/McGraw-Hill
 Canetti, Y. (2008). ¡Qué familión!. Carmel, United States: Hampton-Brown Books
 Canetti, Y. (2008). ¡Qué lista es Gloria!. New York, United States: Macmillan/McGraw-Hill
 Canetti, Y. (1997). ¡Qué sorpresa!. Boston, United States: Houghton Mifflin Co.
 Canetti, Y. (1997). ¡Sal de la cama!. Boston, United States: Houghton Mifflin Co.
 Canetti, Y. (2008). ¡Soy yo!. New York, United States: Macmillan/McGraw-Hill
 Canetti, Y. (2008). ¡Sube, Tati, sube!. New York, United States: Macmillan/McGraw-Hill
 Canetti, Y. (2008). ¡Toma! ¡Dame!. New York, United States: Macmillan/McGraw-Hill
 Canetti, Y. (2008). ¡Vamos a ayudar!. New York, United States: Macmillan/McGraw-Hill
 Canetti, Y. (2008). ¡Viva el arte!. New York, United States: Macmillan/McGraw-Hill
 Canetti, Y. (2008). ¡Yo sí puedo!. New York, United States: Macmillan/McGraw-Hill
 Canetti, Y. (1997). ¡Yo también!. Boston, United States: Houghton Mifflin Co.
 Canetti, Y. (2008). ¿A quién le gusta mi dibujo?. New York, United States: Macmillan/McGraw-Hill
 Canetti, Y. (2014). ¿Cómo es? (Collection: Qué, dónde, cómo y por qué). North Andover, United States: Brickhouse Education
 Canetti, Y. (2008). ¿Cómo está el tiempo hoy?. New York, United States: Macmillan/McGraw-Hill
 Canetti, Y. (2008). ¿Cómo estará el tiempo?. New York, United States: Macmillan/McGraw-Hill
 Canetti, Y. (2008). ¿Cómo trabajar en paz?. New York, United States: Macmillan/McGraw-Hill
 Canetti, Y. (2014). ¿Dónde está? (Collection: Qué, dónde, cómo y por qué). North Andover, United States: Brickhouse Education
 Canetti, Y. (1997). ¿Dónde viven las hormigas?. Boston, United States: Houghton Mifflin Co.
 Canetti, Y. (2008). ¿Por qué el oso duerme en invierno?. New York, United States: Macmillan/McGraw-Hill
 Canetti, Y. (2014). ¿Por qué ocurre? (Collection: Qué, dónde, cómo y por qué). North Andover, United States: Brickhouse Education
 Canetti, Y. (1997). ¿Qué es, Catalina?. Boston, United States: Houghton Mifflin Co.
 Canetti, Y. (2014). ¿Qué es? (Collection: Qué, dónde, cómo y por qué). North Andover, United States: Brickhouse Education
 Canetti, Y. (2020). ¿Qué está pasando allá afuera?. North Andover, United States: Brickhouse Education
 Canetti, Y. (2008). ¿Qué hace Prisi?. New York, United States: Macmillan/McGraw-Hill
 Canetti, Y. (2017). ¿Qué le pasa a Melisa?. New York, United States: BrickHouse Education
 Canetti, Y. (2008). ¿Qué pasó? ¿Qué pasó?. New York, United States: Macmillan/McGraw-Hill
 Canetti, Y. (2008). ¿Qué tiene Lalo?. New York, United States: Macmillan/McGraw-Hill
 Canetti, Y. (2008). ¿Qué tiene usted?. New York, United States: Macmillan/McGraw-Hill
 Canetti, Y. (2008). ¿Quién cuida a los animales?. New York, United States: Macmillan/McGraw-Hill
 Canetti, Y. (2014). ¿Quién lleva una MÁSCARA MISTERIOSA?. North Andover, United States: Brickhouse Education
 Canetti, Y. (2014). ¿Quién tiene PLUMAS ELEGANTES?. North Andover, United States: Brickhouse Education
 Canetti, Y. (2014). ¿Quién tiene una FORMA RARA de hacer las cosas?. North Andover, United States: Brickhouse Education
 Canetti, Y. (2014). ¿Quién tiene una NARIZ GRACIOSA?. North Andover, United States: Brickhouse Education 
 Canetti, Y. (2014). ¿Quién vive en el bosque?. North Andover, United States: BrickHouse Education
 Canetti, Y. (2014). ¿Quién vive en el jardín?. North Andover, United States: BrickHouse Education
 Canetti, Y. (2014). ¿Quién vive en el mar?. North Andover, United States: BrickHouse Education
 Canetti, Y. (2014). ¿Quién vive en la granja?. North Andover, United States: BrickHouse Education
 Canetti, Y. (2008). ¿Quieres quesadilla?. New York, United States: Macmillan/McGraw-Hill
 Canetti, Y. (2008). ¿Te gusta el deporte?. New York, United States: Macmillan/McGraw-Hill
 Canetti, Y. (2008). ¿Te gusta jugar?. New York, United States: Macmillan/McGraw-Hill
 Canetti, Y. (2008). ¿Te gusta la lluvia?. New York, United States: Macmillan/McGraw-Hill
 Canetti, Y. (2020). ¿Un muro seguro-uro-uro?. North Andover, United States: Brickhouse Education
 Canetti, Y. (2010). 1-2-3 Do, Re, Mi: Ants. North Andover, United States: Brickhouse Education
 Canetti, Y. (2010). 1-2-3 Do, Re, Mi: Baby Chicks. North Andover, United States: Brickhouse Education
 Canetti, Y. (2010). 1-2-3 Do, Re, Mi: Puppies. North Andover, United States: Brickhouse Education
 Canetti, Y. (2010). 1-2-3 Do, Re, Mi: Sheep. North Andover, United States: Brickhouse Education
 Canetti, Y. (2010). 1-2-3 Do, Re, Mi: Spiders. North Andover, United States: Brickhouse Education
 Canetti, Y. (2008). A conejo le gusta todo. New York, United States: Macmillan/McGraw-Hill
 Canetti, Y. (2020). A Huge-uge-uge Wall. North Andover, United States: Brickhouse Education
 Canetti, Y. (1996). A la rueda, rueda. Boston, United States: Houghton Mifflin Co.
 Canetti, Y. (1998). A la una sale la luna. Boston, United States: Houghton Mifflin Co.
 Canetti, Y. (2010). A Lullaby for My Doll: Best Buddies. North Andover, United States: Brickhouse Education
 Canetti, Y. (2010). A Lullaby for My Teddy Bear: Best Buddies. North Andover, United States: Brickhouse Education
 Canetti, Y. (2020). A Picture is Worth A Thousand Words Illustrated Proverbs and  Sayings. North Andover, United States: BrickHouse Education
 Canetti, Y. (2014). A que no te atreves. North Andover, United States: Brickhouse Education
 Canetti, Y. (2010). A World of Color: Colores artísticos - Crafty Colors. North Andover, United States: Brickhouse Education
 Canetti, Y. (2010). A World of Color: Colores de sabores - Tasty Colors. North Andover, United States: Brickhouse Education
 Canetti, Y. (2010). A World of Color: Colores deportivos - Sporty Colors. North Andover, United States: Brickhouse Education
 Canetti, Y. (2010). A World of Color: Colores escolares - School Colors. North Andover, United States: Brickhouse Education
 Canetti, Y. (2010). A World of Color: Colores festivos - Party Colors. North Andover, United States: Brickhouse Education
 Canetti, Y. (2010). A World of Color: Colores musicales - Musical Colors. North Andover, United States: Brickhouse Education
 Canetti, Y. (2010). A World of Color: Colores sobre colores - Colors on Colors. North Andover, United States: Brickhouse Education
 Canetti, Y. (2014). A World of Color: Figuras de colores - Colorful Shapes. North Andover, United States: Brickhouse Education
 Canetti, Y. (2010). A World of Color: Paisajes de colores - Colorful Sights. North Andover, United States: Brickhouse Education
 Canetti, Y. (2014). ABC ¡Así soy yo!. North Andover, United States: BrickHouse Education
 Canetti, Y. (1997). ABC ¡Ya me lo sé!. Boston, United States: Houghton Mifflin Co.
 Canetti, Y. (2014). ABC Amazing Me!. North Andover, United States: BrickHouse Education
 Canetti, Y. (2020). ABC's of Emotions. North Andover, United States: Brickhouse Education
 Canetti, Y. (2009). ABC's of Jobs. North Andover, United States: BrickHouse Education
 Canetti, Y. (2010). ABC's of Plants. North Andover, United States: BrickHouse Education
 Canetti, Y. (2010). ABC's of School. North Andover, United States: Brickhouse Education
 Canetti, Y. (2000). Abecedario con sabor. Glenview, United States: Pearson Scott Foresman
 Canetti, Y. (2017). AbeCedario de emociones y sentimientos. North Andover, United States: BrickHouse Education
 Canetti, Y. (2010). ABeCedario de plantas. North Andover, United States: BrickHouse Education
 Canetti, Y. (2010). ABeCedario de profesiones y oficios. North Andover, United States: BrickHouse Education
 Canetti, Y. (2017). AbeCedario deportivo. North Andover, United States: BrickHouse Education
 Canetti, Y. (2010). ABeCedario escolar. North Andover, United States: BrickHouse Education
 Canetti, Y. (2010). ABeCedario musical. North Andover, United States: BrickHouse Education
 Canetti, Y. (2010). ABeCedario nutritivo. North Andover, United States: BrickHouse Education
 Canetti, Y. (2009). ABeCedario salvaje. North Andover, United States: BrickHouse Education
 Canetti, Y. (2008). Abuelito Alberto. New York, United States: Macmillan/McGraw-Hill
 Canetti, Y. (2010). Adivina adivinador ¿De quién es esta sombra?. North Andover, United States: BrickHouse Education
 Canetti, Y. (2010). Adivina adivinador ¿Quién deja esta huella?. North Andover, United States: BrickHouse Education
 Canetti, Y. (2010). Adivina adivinador ¿Quién está escondido?. North Andover, United States: BrickHouse Education
 Canetti, Y. (2010). Adivina adivinador ¿Quién tiene esta piel?. North Andover, United States: BrickHouse Education
 Canetti, Y. (2010). Adivina adivnador ¿Quién me mira así?. North Andover, United States: BrickHouse Education
 Canetti, Y. (2010). Adivina, adivinado: ¿Quién cruza por aquí?. North Andover, United States: BrickHouse Education
 Canetti, Y. (2010). Adivina, Adivinador ¿Qué cruza por aqui?. North Andover, United States: BrickHouse Education
 Canetti, Y. (2010). Adivina, adivinador: ¿Quién se oculta tras la luz?. North Andover, United States: BrickHouse Education
 Canetti, Y. (2009). All otr Nothing. New York, United States: Macmillan/McGraw-Hill
 Canetti, Y. (2010). Amazing Adaptations! Antennae. North Andover, United States: Brickhouse Education
 Canetti, Y. (2010). Amazing Adaptations! Beaks. North Andover, United States: Brickhouse Education
 Canetti, Y. (2010). Amazing Adaptations! Claws. North Andover, United States: Brickhouse Education
 Canetti, Y. (2010). Amazing Adaptations! Crests. North Andover, United States: Brickhouse Education
 Canetti, Y. (2010). Amazing Adaptations! Ears. North Andover, United States: Brickhouse Education
 Canetti, Y. (2010). Amazing Adaptations! Eyes. North Andover, United States: Brickhouse Education
 Canetti, Y. (2010). Amazing Adaptations! Fangs. North Andover, United States: Brickhouse Education
 Canetti, Y. (2010). Amazing Adaptations! Feathers. North Andover, United States: Brickhouse Education
 Canetti, Y. (2010). Amazing Adaptations! Fins and Flippers. North Andover, United States: Brickhouse Education
 Canetti, Y. (2010). Amazing Adaptations! Fur and Skin. North Andover, United States: Brickhouse Education
 Canetti, Y. (2010). Amazing Adaptations! Hair and Fur. North Andover, United States: Brickhouse Education
 Canetti, Y. (2010). Amazing Adaptations! Horns and Antlers. North Andover, United States: Brickhouse Education
 Canetti, Y. (2010). Amazing Adaptations! Legs and Feet. North Andover, United States: Brickhouse Education
 Canetti, Y. (2010). Amazing Adaptations! Manes. North Andover, United States: Brickhouse Education
 Canetti, Y. (2010). Amazing Adaptations! Necks. North Andover, United States: Brickhouse Education
 Canetti, Y. (2010). Amazing Adaptations! Noses. North Andover, United States: Brickhouse Education
 Canetti, Y. (2010). Amazing Adaptations! Scales. North Andover, United States: Brickhouse Education
 Canetti, Y. (2010). Amazing Adaptations! Shells. North Andover, United States: Brickhouse Education
 Canetti, Y. (2010). Amazing Adaptations! Stingers. North Andover, United States: Brickhouse Education
 Canetti, Y. (2010). Amazing Adaptations! Tails. North Andover, United States: Brickhouse Education
 Canetti, Y. (2010). Amazing Adaptations! Teeth. North Andover, United States: Brickhouse Education
 Canetti, Y. (2010). Amazing Adaptations! Tentacles. North Andover, United States: Brickhouse Education
 Canetti, Y. (2010). Amazing Adaptations! Tongues. North Andover, United States: Brickhouse Education
 Canetti, Y. (2010). Amazing Adaptations! Whiskers. North Andover, United States: Brickhouse Education
 Canetti, Y. (2010). Amazing Adaptations! Wings. North Andover, United States: Brickhouse Education
 Canetti, Y. (2014). Andar y disfrutar - En cualquier estación, ¡qué diversión!. North Andover, United States: BrickHouse Education
 Canetti, Y. (2014). Andar y disfrutar - En el mar, ¡qué manera de explorar!. North Andover, United States: BrickHouse Education
 Canetti, Y. (2014). Andar y disfrutar - En el País de la Fantasía, ¡qué alegría!. North Andover, United States: BrickHouse Education
 Canetti, Y. (2014). Andar y disfrutar - En la granja de Gregorio, ¡qué jolgorio!. North Andover, United States: BrickHouse Education
 Canetti, Y. (2014). Animal Connections: What Fits in a Dog's Mouth? ¿Qué le cabe al perro en la boca?. North Andover, United States: BrickHouse Education
 Canetti, Y. (2014). Animal Connections: When is a Bird Ready to Fly? ¿Cuándo está el pájaro listo para volar?. North Andover, United States: BrickHouse Education
 Canetti, Y. (2014). Animal Connections: Where Does a Rabbit Hide? ¿Dónde se esconde el conejo?. North Andover, United States: BrickHouse Education
 Canetti, Y. (2014). Animal Connections: Who Does a Frog Fear? ¿A quién le tiene miedo la rana?. North Andover, United States: BrickHouse Education
 Canetti, Y. (2008). Animales de la granja. New York, United States: Macmillan/McGraw-Hill
 Canetti, Y. (2008). Así la paso bien. New York, United States: Macmillan/McGraw-Hill
 Canetti, Y. (1997). Así me contó el abuelo. Boston, United States: Houghton Mifflin Co.
 Canetti, Y. (2010). Ask a Silly Question: Could It Be?. North Andover, United States: Cambridge BrickHouse
 Canetti, Y. (2010). Ask a Silly Question: Say What?. North Andover, United States: Cambridge BrickHouse
 Canetti, Y. (2008). Aventura en el espacio. New York, United States: Macmillan/McGraw-Hill
 Canetti, Y. (2006-2008). Ay, luna, luna, lunita…. Leon, Spain: Editorial Everest
 Canetti, Y. (2008). Lună, lună, lunişoară. Chisinau, Rumania / Rep. Moldova: Editura Arc • Editura Casteea
 Canetti, Y. (2006-2008). Ay, luna, luna, lunita…with a CD. Leon, Spain: Editorial Everest
 Canetti, Y. (2008). Ayudamos en casa. New York, United States: Macmillan/McGraw-Hill
 Canetti, Y. (2008). Ayudantes del barrio. New York, United States: Macmillan/McGraw-Hill
 Canetti, Y. (2010). Bate bate disparates: ¿Qué le dijo?. North Andover, United States: Brickhouse Education
 Canetti, Y. (2010). Bate bate disparates: Casos y cosas que dan risa. North Andover, United States: BrickHouse Education
 Canetti, Y. (2014). Behind a Fence / Detrás de una cerca (Collection: Hide and Seek, Escondites). North Andover, United States: BrickHouse Education
 Canetti, Y. (2014). North Andover, United States: Brickhouse Education
 Canetti, Y. (2014). Beside and Between, Al lado y entre (Collection: Where Am I? ¿Dónde estoy?). North Andover, United States: Brickhouse Education
 Canetti, Y. (2014). Bilingual Math Poems - Poemas matemáticos bilingües. North Andover, United States: BrickHouse Education
 Canetti, Y. (2008). Bobi. New York, United States: Macmillan/McGraw-Hill
 Canetti, Y. (2008). Bobi. New York, United States: Macmillan/McGraw-Hill
 Canetti, Y. (2019). Buli el sapo y Bibi la bibijagua. Groveport, Ohio, United States: Newmark Learning
 Canetti, Y. (2000,2008). Buscar a María. Glenview, United States: Pearson Scott Foresman
 Canetti, Y. (2010). Canciones para dormir a las muñecas: Dulce compañía. North Andover, United States: BrickHouse Education
 Canetti, Y. (2010). Canciones para dormir a los peluches: Dulce compañía. North Andover, United States: BrickHouse Education
 Canetti, Y. (2010). Canta y cuenta: Las arañas. North Andover, United States: BrickHouse Education
 Canetti, Y. (2010). Canta y cuenta: Las hormigas. North Andover, United States: BrickHouse Education
 Canetti, Y. (2010). Canta y cuenta: Las ovejas. North Andover, United States: BrickHouse Education
 Canetti, Y. (2010). Canta y cuenta: Los elefantes. North Andover, United States: BrickHouse Education
 Canetti, Y. (2010). Canta y cuenta: Los perritos. North Andover, United States: BrickHouse Education
 Canetti, Y. (2010). Canta y cuenta: Los pollitos. North Andover, United States: BrickHouse Education
 Canetti, Y. (1998). Carlita Ropes the Twister. Austin, United States: Steck-Vaughn Publishers
 Canetti, Y. (1997). Celia la pescadora. Boston, United States: Houghton Mifflin Co.
 Canetti, Y. (1995). Cenicienta. Beverly Hills, California, United States: Laredo Publishing Co.
 Canetti, Y. (2008). Cerdito y Mula. New York, United States: Macmillan/McGraw-Hill
 Canetti, Y. (1996-1997). Chapi el chimpancé. Boston, United States: Houghton Mifflin Co.
 Canetti, Y. (2020). Chiquitos y grandiosos. North Andover, United States: BrickHouse Education
 Canetti, Y. (2003). Chu-chu-a, pasa el tren. Boston, United States: Houghton Mifflin Co.
 Canetti, Y. (2020). Colores del Caribe. North Andover, United States: Brickhouse Education / Scholastic
 Canetti, Y. (2014). Colorful Animals  Animales coloridos (Colorful World Mundo colorido collection). North Andover, United States: BrickHouse Education
 Canetti, Y. (2014). Colorful Foods  Alimentos coloridos (Colorful World Mundo colorido collection). North Andover, United States: BrickHouse Education
 Canetti, Y. (2014). Colorful Places  Lugares coloridos (Colorful World Mundo colorido collection). North Andover, United States: BrickHouse Education
 Canetti, Y. (2014). Colorful Toys Juguetes coloridos (Colorful World Mundo colorido collection). North Andover, United States: BrickHouse Education
 Canetti, Y. (2000-2002). Completamente diferente. Leon, United States: Editorial Everest
 Canetti, Y. (2008). Con mi abuelo. New York, United States: Macmillan/McGraw-Hill
 Canetti, Y. (2019). Corre, corre, caballito. Groveport, Ohio, United States: Newmark Learning
 Canetti, Y. Corre, ratón, corre. Groveport, Ohio, United States: Newmark Learning
 Canetti, Y. (1996-1997). Costurera, costurerita. Boston, United States: Houghton Mifflin Co.
 Canetti, Y. (2008). Crecemos juntos. New York, United States: Macmillan/McGraw-Hill
 Canetti, Y. (2008). Cuando estoy así. New York, United States: Macmillan/McGraw-Hill
 Canetti, Y. (2008). Cuando llega la noche. New York, United States: Macmillan/McGraw-Hill
 Canetti, Y. (2008). Cuando Mamá era niña. New York, United States: Macmillan/McGraw-Hill
 Canetti, Y. (2008). Cuando yo sea grande. New York, United States: Macmillan/McGraw-Hill
 Canetti, Y. (2014). Cuentos clásicos matemáticos: Caperucita Roja saca cuentas en un dos por tres. North Andover, United States: BrickHouse Education
 Canetti, Y. (2014). Cuentos clásicos matemáticos: El Muñequito de Mazapán recopila datos. North Andover, United States: BrickHouse Education
 Canetti, Y. (2014). Cuentos clásicos matemáticos: Los músicos de Bremen miden la distancia. North Andover, United States: BrickHouse Education
 Canetti, Y. (2014). Cuentos clásicos matemáticos: Rumpelstiltskin cuenta el dinero. North Andover, United States: BrickHouse Education
 Canetti, Y. (2020). Cuentos de lobos: Caperucita el lobo tramposo. North Andover, United States: BrickHouse Education
 Canetti, Y. (2020). Cuentos de lobos: Los siete cabritos y el lobo goloso. North Andover, United States: BrickHouse Education
 Canetti, Y. (2020). Cuentos de lobos: Los tres cerditos y el lobo bobo. North Andover, United States: BrickHouse Education
 Canetti, Y. (2008). De día y de noche. New York, United States: Macmillan/McGraw-Hill
 Canetti, Y. (2011). De la A a la Z Cuba. Leon, Spain: Everest Editora
 Canetti, Y. (2008). De paseo. New York, United States: Macmillan/McGraw-Hill
 Canetti, Y. (2008). De paseo con Papá. New York, United States: Macmillan/McGraw-Hill
 Canetti, Y. (2000). De vacaciones con Papá. Glenview, : Pearson Scott Foresman
 Canetti, Y. (2018). Diario de Adelita. Groveport, Ohio, United States: Benchmark Education
 Canetti, Y. (2008). Diversión en familia.  New York, United States: Macmillan/McGraw-Hill
 Canetti, Y. (2014). Do You Dare To Do This?. North Andover, United States: BrickHouse Education
 Canetti, Y. (2002). Doña Flautina Resuelvelotodo. Barcelona, Spain /Ecuador: Grupo Edebé / Editorial Don Bosco
 Canetti, Y. (1997). El álbum de la semana. Boston, United States: Houghton Mifflin Co.
 Canetti, Y. (2008). El anillo de Wali. New York, United States: Macmillan/McGraw-Hill
 Canetti, Y. (2008). El árbol de Nacho. New York, United States: Macmillan/McGraw-Hill
 Canetti, Y. (2008). El asno y el alce. New York, United States: Macmillan/McGraw-Hill
 Canetti, Y. (2008). El bebé de la casa. New York, United States: Macmillan/McGraw-Hill
 Canetti, Y. (2008). El bebé elefante. New York, United States: Macmillan/McGraw-Hill
 Canetti, Y. (2008). El bebé león. New York, United States: Macmillan/McGraw-Hill
 Canetti, Y. (2008). El bebé oso. New York, United States: Macmillan/McGraw-Hill
 Canetti, Y. (2000,2008). El bizcocho maravilloso. Glenview, United States: Pearson Scott Foresman
 Canetti, Y. (2000,2008). El bote de Sapo. Glenview, United States: Pearson Scott Foresman
 Canetti, Y. (1997). El concurso. Boston, United States: Houghton Mifflin Co.
 Canetti, Y. (1997). El coyote cantarín. Boston, United States: Houghton Mifflin Co.
 Canetti, Y. (2008). El dibujo de Maya. New York, United States: Macmillan/McGraw-Hill
 Canetti, Y. (1997). El espectáculo. New York, United States: Macmillan/McGraw-Hill
 Canetti, Y. (1997). El grillo saltarín. Boston, United States: Houghton Mifflin Co.
 Canetti, Y. (2019). El jaguar y la nutria. Groveport, Ohio, United States: Newmark Learning
 Canetti, Y. (2008). El león y el ratón. New York, United States: Macmillan/McGraw-Hill
 Canetti, Y. (2000). El misterio de las escobas desaparecidas. Glenview, United States: Pearson Scott Foresman
 Canetti, Y. (2000). El mono desanimado. Glenview, United States: Pearson Scott Foresman
 Canetti, Y. (2010). El mundo es una semilla. Lawrence, United States: BrickHouse Education
 Canetti, Y. (2014). El mundo se va a acabar. North Andover, United States: BrickHouse Education
 Canetti, Y. (2006). El niño que nunca se reía. Barcelona, Spain: Grupo Edebé
 Canetti, Y. (2008). El oso Lalo no es malo. New York, United States: Macmillan/McGraw-Hill
 Canetti, Y. (1995). El patito feo. Beverly Hills, California, United States: Laredo Publishing Co.
 Canetti, Y. (2008). El perrito. New York, United States: Macmillan/McGraw-Hill
 Canetti, Y. (2006,2008). El príncipe azul. Leon, Spain: Editorial Everest
 Canetti, Y. (2008). El ramo. New York, United States: Macmillan/McGraw-Hill
 Canetti, Y. (1995). El reloj y yo. Beverly Hills, California, United States: Laredo Publishing Co.
 Canetti, Y. (2008). El tapete maravilloso. New York, United States: Macmillan/McGraw-Hill
 Canetti, Y. (2017). El Tesoro del Rey Orontes. Groveport, Ohio, United States: Benchmark Education Company
 Canetti, Y. (2019). El tucán y la tortuga. Groveport, Ohio, United States: Newmark Learning
 Canetti, Y. (2008). El universo de Ronda. New York, United States: Macmillan/McGraw-Hill
 Canetti, Y. (2019). El Urubú y el Sapo. Groveport, Ohio, United States: Newmark Learning
 Canetti, Y. (2010). Ellos lo hace bien, ¡nosotros también! Acrobacias. North Andover, United States: BrickHouse Education
 Canetti, Y. (2010). Ellos lo hace bien, ¡nosotros también! Acurrucarse. North Andover, United States: BrickHouse Education
 Canetti, Y. (2010). Ellos lo hace bien, ¡nosotros también! Agacharse. North Andover, United States: BrickHouse Education
 Canetti, Y. (2010). Ellos lo hace bien, ¡nosotros también! Agarrarse. North Andover, United States: BrickHouse Education
 Canetti, Y. (2010). Ellos lo hace bien, ¡nosotros también! Atrapar. North Andover, United States: BrickHouse Education
 Canetti, Y. (2010). Ellos lo hace bien, ¡nosotros también! Bajar. North Andover, United States: BrickHouse Education
 Canetti, Y. (2010). Ellos lo hace bien, ¡nosotros también! Bucear. North Andover, United States: BrickHouse Education
 Canetti, Y. (2010). Ellos lo hace bien, ¡nosotros también! Cargar. North Andover, United States: BrickHouse Education
 Canetti, Y. (2010). Ellos lo hace bien, ¡nosotros también! Correr. North Andover, United States: BrickHouse Education
 Canetti, Y. (2010). Ellos lo hace bien, ¡nosotros también! Deslizarse. North Andover, United States: BrickHouse Education
 Canetti, Y. (2010). Ellos lo hace bien, ¡nosotros también! Escarbar. North Andover, United States: BrickHouse Education
 Canetti, Y. (2010). Ellos lo hace bien, ¡nosotros también! Esconderse. North Andover, United States: BrickHouse Education
 Canetti, Y. (2010). Ellos lo hace bien, ¡nosotros también! Iluminar. North Andover, United States: BrickHouse Education
 Canetti, Y. (2010). Ellos lo hace bien, ¡nosotros también! Inflarse. North Andover, United States: BrickHouse Education
 Canetti, Y. (2010). Ellos lo hace bien, ¡nosotros también! Jugar. North Andover, United States: BrickHouse Education
 Canetti, Y. (2010). Ellos lo hace bien, ¡nosotros también! Lanzarse. North Andover, United States: BrickHouse Education
 Canetti, Y. (2010). Ellos lo hace bien, ¡nosotros también! Nadar. North Andover, United States: BrickHouse Education
 Canetti, Y. (2010). Ellos lo hace bien, ¡nosotros también! Pararse. North Andover, United States: BrickHouse Education
 Canetti, Y. (2010). Ellos lo hace bien, ¡nosotros también! Pescar. North Andover, United States: BrickHouse Education
 Canetti, Y. (2010). Ellos lo hace bien, ¡nosotros también! Sostenerse. North Andover, United States: BrickHouse Education
 Canetti, Y. (2010). Ellos lo hace bien, ¡nosotros también! Subir. North Andover, United States: BrickHouse Education
 Canetti, Y. (2010). Ellos lo hace bien, ¡nosotros también! Ver en la oscuridad. North Andover, United States: BrickHouse Education
 Canetti, Y. (2010). Ellos lo hace bien, ¡nosotros también! Volar. North Andover, United States: BrickHouse Education
 Canetti, Y. (2010). Ellos lo hacen bien, ¡nosotros también! Saltar. North Andover, United States: BrickHouse Education
 Canetti, Y. (2010). Ellos lo hacen bien, ¡nosotros también! Sentarse. North Andover, United States: BrickHouse Education
 Canetti, Y. (2010). Ellos lo hacne bien, ¡nosotros también! Trepar. North Andover, United States: BrickHouse Education
 Canetti, Y. (2008). En casa. New York, United States: Macmillan/McGraw-Hill
 Canetti, Y. (2008). En clase. New York, United States: Macmillan/McGraw-Hill
 Canetti, Y. (2000,2008). En el bosque. Glenview, United States: Pearson Scott Foresman
 Canetti, Y. (2008). En el mercado. New York, United States: Macmillan/McGraw-Hill
 Canetti, Y. (2008). En el parque. New York, United States: Macmillan/McGraw-Hill
 Canetti, Y. (1997). En la granja. Boston, United States: Houghton Mifflin Co.
 Canetti, Y. (2008). En la loma. New York, United States: Macmillan/McGraw-Hill
 Canetti, Y. (1997). En la noche. New York, United States: Houghton Mifflin Co.
 Canetti, Y. (2008). En lo oscuro. New York, United States: Macmillan/McGraw-Hill
 Canetti, Y. (1997). En mi nuevo barrio. Boston, United States: Houghton Mifflin Co.
 Canetti, Y. (2010). En tiempos difíciles. Lawrence, United States: Brickhouse Education
 Canetti, Y. (2003). Escritoras cubanas: La memoria hechizada. Barcelona, Spain: Icaria Editorial
 Canetti, Y. (2015). Estaciones estelares (collection Lucecitas). North Andover, United States: BrickHouse Education
 Canetti, Y. (2008). Fiesta en familia. New York, United States: Macmillan/McGraw-Hill
 Canetti, Y. (2008). Flecha no está sola. New York, United States: Macmillan/McGraw-Hill
 Canetti, Y. (2019). Goyo en la librería. Groveport, Ohio, United States: Newmark Learning
 Canetti, Y. (2015). Granja grandiiosa (collection Lucecitas). North Andover, United States: BrickHouse Education
 Canetti, Y. (2010). Guess Who?  Who's Looking At Me?. North Andover, United States: BrickHouse Education
 Canetti, Y. (2010). Guess Who? Who Crosses Here?. North Andover, United States: BrickHouse Education
 Canetti, Y. (2010). Guess Who? Who is Looking At Me. North Andover, United States: BrickHouse Education
 Canetti, Y. (2010). Guess Who? Who's Hidding?. North Andover, United States: BrickHouse Education
 Canetti, Y. (2010). Guess Who? Whose Shadow is This?. North Andover, United States: BrickHouse Education
 Canetti, Y. (2010). Guess Who? Whose Shadow Is This?. North Andover, United States: BrickHouse Education
 Canetti, Y. (2010). Guess Who? Whose Silhouette Is this?. North Andover, United States: BrickHouse Education
 Canetti, Y. (2010). Guess Who? Whose Skin Is This?. North Andover, United States: BrickHouse Education
 Canetti, Y. (2010). Guess Who? Whose Tracks Are There?. North Andover, United States: BrickHouse Education
 Canetti, Y. (2009). Había  OTRA vez: Aladino y la lámpara espantosa. Leon, Spain: Editorial Everest
 Canetti, Y. (2009). Había OTRA vez : La fea durmiente. Leon, Spain: Editorial Everest
 Canetti, Y. (2009). Había OTRA vez: Blanca Nieve y los siete gigantones. Leon, Spain: Editorial Everest
 Canetti, Y. (2009). Había OTRA vez: Caperucita descolorida. Leon, Spain: Editorial Everest
 Canetti, Y. (2009). Había OTRA vez: Ceniciento. Leon, Spain: Editorial Everest
 Canetti, Y. (2009). Había OTRA vez: El patito bello. Leon, Spain: Editorial Everest
 Canetti, Y. (2009). Había OTRA vez: La peluca de Rapunzel. Leon, United States: Editorial Everest
 Canetti, Y. (2009). Había OTRA vez: Pinocho no era el mentiroso. Leon, Spain: Editorial Everest
 Canetti, Y. (2008). Habla, Bruno, habla. New York, United States: Macmillan/McGraw-Hill
 Canetti, Y. (2014). Healthy Life - Catch it! / ¡Atrápalo!. North Andover, United States: BrickHouse Education
 Canetti, Y. (2014). Healthy Life - Do it! / ¡Hazlo!. North Andover, United States: BrickHouse Education
 Canetti, Y. (2014). Healthy Life - Move it! / ¡Muévelo!. North Andover, United States: BrickHouse Education
 Canetti, Y. (2014). Healthy Life - Try it! / ¡Inténtalo!. North Andover, United States: BrickHouse Education
 Canetti, Y. (2008). Hecho a mano. New York, United States: Macmillan/McGraw-Hill
 Canetti, Y. (2017). Hernando de Soto, Apolinaria Lorenzana, Joaquín Murrieta. Groveport, Ohio, United States: Benchmark Education Company
 Canetti, Y. (2003). How Many Climates Does One Island Need?.  Austin, United States: Steck-Vaughn Publishers
 Canetti, Y. (2010). I Can Be President, Too!. Boston, United States: BrickHouse Education
 Canetti, Y. (2016). I Could Be the Next President. North Andover, United States: BrickHouse Education
 Canetti, Y. (2015). I Have a Brother But…. North Andover, United States: BrickHouse Education
 Canetti, Y. (2014). I Spy At Home. North Andover, United States: BrickHouse Education
 Canetti, Y. (2014). I Spy In the Forest. North Andover, United States: BrickHouse Education
 Canetti, Y. (2014). I Spy In the Market. North Andover, United States: BrickHouse Education
 Canetti, Y. (2014). I Spy In The Ocean. North Andover, United States: BrickHouse Education
 Canetti, Y. (2010). I'm Proud To Be Me!. North Andover, United States: BrickHouse Education
 Canetti, Y. (2010). Imagina un mundo mejor. North Andover, United States: BrickHouse Education
 Canetti, Y. (2008). Imagínalo, Yoyi. New York, United States: Macmillan/McGraw-Hill
 Canetti, Y. (2010). Imagine a Better World. North Andover, United States: BrickHouse Education
 Canetti, Y. (2014). In a Pocket / En un bolsillo (Collection: Hide and Seek, Escondites). North Andover, United States: Brickhouse Education
 Canetti, Y. (1997). In my New Neighborhood. Boston, United States: Houghton Mifflin Co.
 Canetti, Y. (2014). Inside and Outside, Dentro y fuera (Collection: Where Am I? ¿Dónde estoy?). North Andover, United States: Brickhouse Education
 Canetti, Y. (2019). Juan Pin y el oro sin fin. Groveport, Ohio, United States: Newmark Learning
 Canetti, Y. (2008). Juntos y contentos. New York, United States: Macmillan/McGraw-Hill
 Canetti, Y. (2008). Keli y yo. New York, United States: Macmillan/McGraw-Hill
 Canetti, Y. (2010). La adaptación, ¡qué sensación! Aguijones. North Andover, United States: Brickhouse Education
 Canetti, Y. (2010). La adaptación, ¡qué sensación! Alas. North Andover, United States: Brickhouse Education
 Canetti, Y. (2010). La adaptación, ¡qué sensación! Aletas. North Andover, United States: Brickhouse Education
 Canetti, Y. (2010). La adaptación, ¡qué sensación! Antenas. North Andover, United States: Brickhouse Education
 Canetti, Y. (2010). La adaptación, ¡qué sensación! Bigotes. North Andover, United States: Brickhouse Education
 Canetti, Y. (2010). La adaptación, ¡qué sensación! Caparazones y conchas. North Andover, United States: Brickhouse Education
 Canetti, Y. (2010). La adaptación, ¡qué sensación! Colas. North Andover, United States: Brickhouse Education
 Canetti, Y. (2010). La adaptación, ¡qué sensación! Colmillos. North Andover, United States: Brickhouse Education
 Canetti, Y. (2010). La adaptación, ¡qué sensación! Crestas. North Andover, United States: Brickhouse Education
 Canetti, Y. (2010). La adaptación, ¡qué sensación! Crines y melenas. North Andover, United States: Brickhouse Education
 Canetti, Y. (2010). La adaptación, ¡qué sensación! Cuellos. North Andover, United States: Brickhouse Education
 Canetti, Y. (2010). La adaptación, ¡qué sensación! Cuernos. North Andover, United States: Brickhouse Education
 Canetti, Y. (2010). La adaptación, ¡qué sensación! Dientes. North Andover, United States: Brickhouse Education
 Canetti, Y. (2010). La adaptación, ¡qué sensación! Escamas. North Andover, United States: Brickhouse Education
 Canetti, Y. (2010). La adaptación, ¡qué sensación! Garras y tenazas. North Andover, United States: Brickhouse Education
 Canetti, Y. (2010). La adaptación, ¡qué sensación! Lenguas. North Andover, United States: Brickhouse Education
 Canetti, Y. (2010). La adaptación, ¡qué sensación! Narices. North Andover, United States: Brickhouse Education
 Canetti, Y. (2010). La adaptación, ¡qué sensación! Ojos. North Andover, United States: Brickhouse Education
 Canetti, Y. (2010). La adaptación, ¡qué sensación! Orejas. North Andover, United States: Brickhouse Education
 Canetti, Y. (2010). La adaptación, ¡qué sensación! Patas. North Andover, United States: Brickhouse Education
 Canetti, Y. (2010). La adaptación, ¡qué sensación! Pelos. North Andover, United States: Brickhouse Education
 Canetti, Y. (2010). La adaptación, ¡qué sensación! Picos. North Andover, United States: Brickhouse Education
 Canetti, Y. (2010). La adaptación, ¡qué sensación! Pieles. North Andover, United States: Brickhouse Education
 Canetti, Y. (2010). La adaptación, ¡qué sensación! Plumas. North Andover, United States: Brickhouse Education
 Canetti, Y. (2010). La adaptación, ¡qué sensación! Tentáculos. North Andover, United States: Brickhouse Education
 Canetti, Y. (2008). La alegría de cada día. New York, United States: Macmillan/McGraw-Hill
 Canetti, Y. (2010). La alegría de estar juntos: Casi iguales. North Andover, United States: BrickHouse Education
 Canetti, Y. (2010). La alegría de estar juntos: No somos tan diferentes. North Andover, United States: BrickHouse Education
 Canetti, Y. (2010). La alegría de estar juntos: Siempre contigo mi amigo. North Andover, United States: BrickHouse Education
 Canetti, Y. (2008). La ardilla Angelina. New York, United States: Macmillan/McGraw-Hill / Red Brick Learning
 Canetti, Y. (2020). La cambiante y divertida naturaleza. North Andover, United States: BrickHouse Education
 Canetti, Y. (2014). La canción de la armonía. North Andover, United States: BrickHouse Education
 Canetti, Y. (1997). La carrera. Boston, United States: Houghton Mifflin Co.
 Canetti, Y. (1994). La culebra y el Halcón. Bevery Hill, California, United States: Laredo Publishing Company
 Canetti, Y. (2008). La fiesta de Ceci. New York, United States: Macmillan/McGraw-Hill
 Canetti, Y. (1997). La florería del abuelo. Boston, United States: Houghton Mifflin Co.
 Canetti, Y. La foto chistosa. United States: Pearson Scott Foresman
 Canetti, Y. (2008). La hormiga y el saltamontes. New York, United States: Macmillan/McGraw-Hill
 Canetti, Y. (2008). La hormiga y la paloma. New York, United States: Macmillan/McGraw-Hill
 Canetti, Y. (2008). La hormiguita orgullosa. New York, United States: Macmillan/McGraw-Hill
 Canetti, Y. (2008). La idea de Manuela. New York, United States: Macmillan/McGraw-Hill
 Canetti, Y. (2017). La luna no es de queso. Huntington Beach, California, United States: Teacher Created Materials
 Canetti, Y. (2020). La luna, la luna. North Andover, United States: BrickHouse Education / Scholastic
 Canetti, Y. (2000). La más hermosa. Glenview, United States: Pearson Scott Foresman
 Canetti, Y. (2000). La mascota de Patricia. Glenview, United States: Pearson Scott Foresman
 Canetti, Y. (2008). La mascota juguetona. New York, United States: Macmillan/McGraw-Hill
 Canetti, Y. (2008). La moto. New York, United States: Macmillan/McGraw-Hill
 Canetti, Y. (2000). La pesa de Nino. New York, United States: Pearson Scott Foresman
 Canetti, Y. (2008). La sopa. New York, United States: Macmillan/McGraw-Hill
 Canetti, Y. (1997). La tortuga de Paula. Boston, United States: Houghton Mifflin Co.
 Canetti, Y. (2010). La vida es color de Rosa. Lawrence, United States: Cambridge BrickHouse: CBH Books
 Canetti, Y. (1995). Las babuchas de la mala suerte. Beverly Hills, California, United States: Laredo Publishing Co.
 Canetti, Y. (2008). Las maravillas de una sencilla sombrilla amarilla. Leon, Spain: Editorial Everest
 Canetti, Y. (2014). Learn and Laugh - Who Has a Funny Nose?. North Andover, United States: BrickHouse Education
 Canetti, Y. (2014). Learn and Laugh - Who Has a Mysterious Mask?. North Andover, United States: BrickHouse Education
 Canetti, Y. (2014). Learn and Laugh - Who Has a Weird Way to Do Something?. North Andover, United States: BrickHouse Education
 Canetti, Y. (2014). Learn and Laugh - Who Has Fancy Feathers?. North Andover, United States: BrickHouse Education
 Canetti, Y. (2020). Leer es peligroso y altamente contagioso. North Andover, United States: Brickhouse Education
 Canetti, Y. (2014). Little Lights: Fantastic Farm. North Andover, United States: BrickHouse Education
 Canetti, Y. (2014). Little Lights: Moving Machine. North Andover, United States: BrickHouse Education
 Canetti, Y. (2014). Little Lights: Place to Play. North Andover, United States: BrickHouse Education
 Canetti, Y. (2014). Little Lights': Sensational Seasons. North Andover, United States: BrickHouse Education
 Canetti, Y. (2008). Lo que soñó Yuli. New York, United States: Macmillan/McGraw-Hill
 Canetti, Y. (2016). Look at Them! Reading Skills: Ask Questions. North Andover, United States: BrickHouse Education
 Canetti, Y. (2016). Look at Them! Reading Skills: Compare and Contrast. North Andover, United States: BrickHouse Education
 Canetti, Y. (2016). Look at Them! Reading Skills: Draw Conclusions. North Andover, United States: BrickHouse Education
 Canetti, Y. (2016). Look at Them! Reading Skills: Fact and Opinion. North Andover, United States: BrickHouse Education
 Canetti, Y. (2016). Look at Them! Reading Skills: Fantasy and Reality. North Andover, United States: BrickHouse Education
 Canetti, Y. (2016). Look at Them! Reading Skills: Fiction and Non-Fiction. North Andover, United States: BrickHouse Education
 Canetti, Y. (2016). Look at Them! Reading Skills: Main Character and Secondary Characters. North Andover, United States: BrickHouse Education
 Canetti, Y. (2016). Look at Them! Reading Skills: Main Idea and Details. North Andover, United States: BrickHouse Education
 Canetti, Y. (2016). Look at Them! Reading Skills: Make Inferences. North Andover, United States: BrickHouse Education
 Canetti, Y. (2016). Look at Them! Reading Skills: Make Predictions. North Andover, United States: BrickHouse Education
 Canetti, Y. (2016). Look at Them! Reading Skills: Picture's Clues. North Andover, United States: BrickHouse Education
 Canetti, Y. (2016). Look at Them! Reading Skills: Sequence. North Andover, United States: BrickHouse Education
 Canetti, Y. (1997). Lora, Sapo y Oso. Boston, United States: Houghton Mifflin Co.
 Canetti, Y. (1997). Los cuatro artistas. Boston, United States: Houghton Mifflin Co.
 Canetti, Y. (2019). Los diamantes en el cielo. Groveport, Ohio, United States: Newmark Learning
 Canetti, Y. (2014). Los muñecos de nieve se divierten. North Andover, United States: Brickhouse Education
 Canetti, Y. (1997). Los regalos de Ricardo. Boston, United States: Houghton Mifflin Co.
 Canetti, Y. (2008). Los tres chivitos. New York, United States: Macmillan/McGraw-Hill
 Canetti, Y. (2008). Los tres ositos. New York, United States: Macmillan/McGraw-Hill
 Canetti, Y. (2008). Los tres ratoncitos. New York, United States: Macmillan/McGraw-Hill
 Canetti, Y. (2014). Loving Life - Dear Animals / Queridos animales. North Andover, United States: BrickHouse Education
 Canetti, Y. (2014). Loving Life - From My Window / Desde mi ventana. North Andover, United States: BrickHouse Education
 Canetti, Y. (2014). Loving Life - Huge Hugs / Abrazos enormes. North Andover, United States: BrickHouse Education
 Canetti, Y. (2014). Loving Life - Reasons To Be Happy / Razones para ser feliz. North Andover, United States: BrickHouse Education
 Canetti, Y. (2008). Lugares del barrio. New York, United States: Macmillan/McGraw-Hill
 Canetti, Y. (2015). Lupita sabe rimar. Groveport, Ohio, United States: Benchmark Education Company
 Canetti, Y. (2017). Magic Words: Good morning! / ¡Buenos días!. North Andover, United States: BrickHouse Education
 Canetti, Y. (2017). Magic Words: Good night! / ¡Buenas noches!. North Andover, United States: BrickHouse Education
 Canetti, Y. (2017). Magic Words: Please! / ¡Por favor!. North Andover, United States: BrickHouse Education
 Canetti, Y. (2017). Magic Words: Thank you! / ¡Gracias!. North Andover, United States: BrickHouse Education
 Canetti, Y. (2015). Máquinas en movimiento (collection Lucecitas). North Andover, United States: BrickHouse Education
 Canetti, Y. (2014). Matemáticamente ¿Qué animales tienen forma redonda?. North Andover, United States: BrickHouse Education
 Canetti, Y. (2014). Matemáticamente ¿Qué animales tienen manchas?. North Andover, United States: BrickHouse Education
 Canetti, Y. (2014). Matemáticamente ¿Qué animales tienen ocho paptas?. North Andover, United States: BrickHouse Education
 Canetti, Y. (2014). Matemáticamente ¿Qué animales tienen rayas?. North Andover, United States: BrickHouse Education
 Canetti, Y. (2014). Math Minded: Which Animals Have a Round Shape?. North Andover, United States: BrickHouse Education
 Canetti, Y. (2014). Math Minded: Which Animals Have Eight Legs?. North Andover, United States: BrickHouse Education
 Canetti, Y. (2014). Math Minded: Which Animals Have Spots?. North Andover, United States: BrickHouse Education
 Canetti, Y. (2014). Math Minded: Which Animals Have Stripes?. North Andover, United States: BrickHouse Education
 Canetti, Y. (2008). Me gusta, me gusta. New York, United States: Macmillan/McGraw-Hill
 Canetti, Y. (2014). Me han dicho que he dicho un dicho: Proverbios ilustrados. North Andover, United States: BrickHouse Education
 Canetti, Y. (2008). Mi amigo Coco. New York, United States: Macmillan/McGraw-Hill
 Canetti, Y. (1996). Mi ciudad. Boston, United States: Houghton Mifflin Co.
 Canetti, Y. (2008). Mi diente flojo. New York, United States: Macmillan/McGraw-Hill
 Canetti, Y. (2008). Mi gato. Glenview, United States: Pearson Scott Foresman
 Canetti, Y. (2008). Mi hermano Kiko. New York, United States: Macmillan/McGraw-Hill
 Canetti, Y. (2003). Mi prima Vera. Boston, United States: Houghton Mifflin Co.
 Canetti, Y. (1997). Mi tía. Boston, United States: Houghton Mifflin Co.
 Canetti, Y. (2008). Mi vecindario. New York, United States: Macmillan/McGraw-Hill
 Canetti, Y. (2000). Mi viaje con papá. Chicago, United States: Scott Foresman
 Canetti, Y. (2008). Minino. New York, United States: Macmillan/McGraw-Hill
 Canetti, Y. (2000). Mira a quién encontré. Glenview, United States: Pearson Scott Foresman
 Canetti, Y. (2008). Mira qué familia. New York, United States: Macmillan/McGraw-Hill
 Canetti, Y. (2008). Multiplicar con los dedos: la regla del nueve. Vero Beach, Florida: Rourke Pub.
 Canetti, Y. (2010). Musical ABC's. North Andover, United States: Brickhouse Education
 Canetti, Y. (2019). My Big Family. New York, United States: Reycraft Books
 Canetti, Y. (2014). My Body. Mi cuerpo (bilingual collection: Just Me , Solo yo). North Andover, United States: BrickHouse Education
 Canetti, Y. (2014). My Family. Mi familia (bilingual collection: Just Me , Solo yo). North Andover, United States: BrickHouse Education
 Canetti, Y. (2014). My First Bilingual ABC, Mi primer abecedario bilingüe. North Andover, United States: Brickhouse Education
 Canetti, Y. (2011). Nada es lo que parece. México, México: Editorial Progreso
 Canetti, Y. (2008). Neno. New York, United States: Macmillan/McGraw-Hill
 Canetti, Y. (2012). Nothing is Impossible. New York, : Macmillan/McGraw-Hill
 Canetti, Y. (1998). Novelita Rosa. Andover, United States: (Versal Editorial Group)
 Canetti, Y. (2014). On a Tree / Sobre un árbol (Collection: Hide and Seek, Escondites). North Andover, United States: BrickHouse Education
 Canetti, Y. (2005). On Our Street. Boston, United States: Houghton Mifflin Co.
 Canetti, Y. (2010). Our Great Big World. North Andover, United States: BrickHouse Education
 Canetti, Y. (2000). Our World of Wonders. Austin, United States: Steck-Vaughn Publishers
 Canetti, Y. (2014). Over and Under, Encima y debajo (Collection: Where Am I? ¿Dónde estoy?). North Andover, United States: Brickhouse Education
 Canetti, Y. (1997). Paco y el taco (versión en rima). Boston, United States: Houghton Mifflin
 Canetti, Y. (1997). Paco y su familia (versión en rima). Boston, United States: Houghton Mifflin
 Canetti, Y. (1996,1997). Palabras, palabras. Boston, United States:  Houghton Mifflin Co.
 Canetti, Y. (1997). Para algo son los amigos. Boston, United States: Houghton Mifflin Co.
 Canetti, Y. (2015). Parques y paseos (collection Lucecitas). North Andover, United States: BrickHouse Education
 Canetti, Y. (2008). Pásame la pelota. New York, United States: Macmillan/McGraw-Hill
 Canetti, Y. (2008). Pelusa. New York, United States: Macmillan/McGraw-Hill
 Canetti, Y. (1997). Pero no por mucho tiempo. Boston, United States: Houghton Mifflin Co.
 Canetti, Y. (2007). Rafi’s Secret. New York, United States: Macmillan/McGraw-Hill
 Canetti, Y. (2008). Regalos. New York, United States: Macmillan/McGraw-Hill
 Canetti, Y. (2010). Rhyming Tongue-Twisters: Animals. North Andover, United States: BrickHouse Education
 Canetti, Y. (2010). Rhyming Tongue-Twisters: Art. North Andover, United States: BrickHouse Education
 Canetti, Y. (2010). Rhyming Tongue-Twisters: Math. North Andover, United States: BrickHouse Education
 Canetti, Y. (2010). Rhyming Tongue-Twisters: Science. North Andover, United States: BrickHouse Education
 Canetti, Y. (2008). Rigo y la llama maravillosa. New York, United States: Macmillan/McGraw-Hill
 Canetti, Y. (2013). Rima con risa: El capricho de Pancho. North Andover, United States: BrickHouse Education
 Canetti, Y. (2013). Rima con risa: El gigantón Tontón. North Andover, United States: BrickHouse Education
 Canetti, Y. (2013). Rima con risa: El moño de Doña Carmiña. North Andover, United States: BrickHouse Education
 Canetti, Y. (2013). Rima con risa: Erre con erre, catarro. North Andover, United States: BrickHouse Education
 Canetti, Y. (2013). Rima con risa: La ridícula fórmula mágica. North Andover, United States: BrickHouse Education
 Canetti, Y. (2013). Rima con risa: Un suceso escandaloso. North Andover, United States: BrickHouse Education
 Canetti, Y. (2008). Rino lo ve todo. New York, United States: Macmillan/McGraw-Hill
 Canetti, Y. (2008). Rumbo al campo. New York, United States: Macmillan/McGraw-Hill
 Canetti, Y. (1994). Secretos de palacio. Havana, Argentina: (Editorial Gente Nueva)
 Canetti, Y. (2014). Snowmen Have Fund. North Andover, United States: BrickHouse Education
 Canetti, Y. (2008). Solo como un perro. Leon, United States: Editorial Everest
 Canetti, Y. (2010). Soy original, ¡genial!. North Andover, United States: BrickHouse Education
 Canetti, Y. (2020). Sport ABC's. North Andover, United States: Brickhouse Education
 Canetti, Y. (2020). Sueños. North Andover, United States: Brickhouse Education / Scholastic
 Canetti, Y. (2000). The Around-the-World-Lunch. Austin, United States: Steck-Vaughn Publishers
 Canetti, Y. (2003). The Curse of the Jungle Treasure. New York, United States: Scholastic
 Canetti, Y. (2009). The Family Farm. Glenview, United States: Pearson Scott Foresman
 Canetti, Y. (1997). The Mural. Beverly Hills, California, United States: Laredo Publishing Co.
 Canetti, Y. (2014). The Peaceful Tune. North Andover, United States: BrickHouse Education
 Canetti, Y. (2014). The Way I Am. Yo soy así (billingual collection: Just Me, Solo yo). North Andover, United States: BrickHouse Education
 Canetti, Y. (2014). The Way I Feel. Yo me siento así (bilingual collection: Just Me, Solo yo). North Andover, United States: BrickHouse Education
 Canetti, Y. (2014). The World is Going To End. North Andover, United States: BrickHouse Education
 Canetti, Y. (2008). Tito y Tita. New York, United States: Macmillan/McGraw-Hill
 Canetti, Y. (2017). Tlacuache y Coyote. Groveport, Ohio, United States: Newmark Learning LLC
 Canetti, Y. (2010). Together Is Better: Almost The Same. Lawrence, United States: BrickHouse Education
 Canetti, Y. (2010). Together Is Better: Friends to the End. Lawrence, United States: BrickHouse Education
 Canetti, Y. (2010). Together Is Better: Not So Different. Lawrence, United States: BrickHouse Education
 Canetti, Y. (1997). Toño y Toña. Boston, United States: Houghton Mifflin Co.
 Canetti, Y. (2010). Trabalenguas artísticos. North Andover, United States: Brickhouse Education
 Canetti, Y. (2010). Trabalenguas científicos. North Andover, United States: Brickhouse Education
 Canetti, Y. (2010). Trabalenguas matemáticos. North Andover, United States: Brickhouse Education
 Canetti, Y. (2010). Trabalenguas zoológicos. North Andover, United States: Brickhouse Education
 Canetti, Y. (2010). Tradición con diversión: Danza de adivinanzas con enseñanzas. North Andover, United States: BrickHouse Education
 Canetti, Y. (2010). Tradición con diversión: Fiesta de fábulas fabulosas. North Andover, United States: BrickHouse Education
 Canetti, Y. (2010). Tradición con diversión: Las rimas de la abuela me ayudan en la escuela. North Andover, United States: BrickHouse Education
 Canetti, Y. (2010). Tradición con diversión: Treinta y tres trabalenguas tradicionales. North Andover, United States: BrickHouse Education
 Canetti, Y. (2008). Un amigo inteligente. New York, United States: Macmillan/McGraw-Hill
 Canetti, Y. (2008). Un día especial para Sixta. New York, United States: Macmillan/McGraw-Hill
 Canetti, Y. (1997). Un fabuloso viaje al Caribe • A Fabulous Trip to the Caribbean. Boston, United States: Houghton Mifflin
 Canetti, Y. (1997). Un lugar para la mariposa. Boston, United States: Houghton Mifflin Co.
 Canetti, Y. (2008). Un papel importante. New York, United States: Macmillan/McGraw-Hill
 Canetti, Y. (2008). Un pato famoso. New York, United States: Macmillan/McGraw-Hill
 Canetti, Y. (2005). Un poquito más. Leon, Spain: Editorial Everest / National Geographic School
 Canetti, Y. (2008). Um bocadinho mais. Rio de Mouro, Portugal: Everest Editora
 Canetti, Y. (2008). Ce poate face o furnica. Rumania / Rep. Moldova, Rumania / Rep. Moldova: Editura Arc • Editura Casteea
 Canetti, Y. (1997). Un viaje a las montañas. Boston, United States: Houghton Mifflin Co.
 Canetti, Y. (2008). Una abejita como yo. New York, United States: Macmillan/McGraw-Hill
 Canetti, Y. (2008). Una buena idea. New York, United States: Macmillan/McGraw-Hill
 Canetti, Y. (2008). Una caminata. New York, United States: Macmillan/McGraw-Hill
 Canetti, Y. (2000,2008). Una carreta. Glenview, United States: Pearson Scott Foresman
 Canetti, Y. (2000). Una fiesta divertida. Glenview, United States: Pearson Scott Foresman
 Canetti, Y. (2008). Una mascota para Gema. New York, United States: Macmillan/McGraw-Hill
 Canetti, Y. (2000). Una mascota para Pedro. Glenview, United States: Pearson Scott Foresman
 Canetti, Y. (2017). Una niña asombrosa. North Andover, United States: BrickHouse Education
 Canetti, Y. (2014). Under a Blanket / Debajo de una manta (Collection: Hide and Seek, Escondites). North Andover, United States: BrickHouse Education
 Canetti, Y. (2012). Uno Dos Tres My First Spanish Rhymes. London, United States: Frances Lincoln Children Books
 Canetti, Y. (2018). Up, Down, and Around: Dear Sun, Dear Moon - Amigo Sol, Amiga Luna. North Andover, United States: BrickHouse Education
 Canetti, Y. (2018). Up, Down, and Around: I Can Fly - Yo puedo volar. North Andover, United States: BrickHouse Education
 Canetti, Y. (2018). Up, Down, and Around: Shadow Show - Asombrosa sombra. North Andover, United States: BrickHouse Education
 Canetti, Y. (2008). Usa el mapa. New York, United States: Macmillan/McGraw-Hill
 Canetti, Y. (2008). Vamos al molino. New York, United States: Macmillan/McGraw-Hill
 Canetti, Y. (2008). Vamos al nido. New York, United States: Macmillan/McGraw-Hill
 Canetti, Y. (2008). Vamos al parque. New York, United States: Macmillan/McGraw-Hill
 Canetti, Y. (2014). Veo veo en el bosque. North Andover, United States: BrickHouse Education
 Canetti, Y. (2014). Veo veo en el mar. North Andover, United States: BrickHouse Education
 Canetti, Y. (2014). Veo veo en el mercado. North Andover, United States: BrickHouse Education
 Canetti, Y. (2014). Veo veo en la casa. North Andover, United States: BrickHouse Education
 Canetti, Y. (2008). Vito ve un animalit. New York, United States: Macmillan/McGraw-Hill
 Canetti, Y. (2008). Vivir aquí. New York, United States: Macmillan/McGraw-Hill
 Canetti, Y. (2014). Walk and Enjoy - At the Sea and Shore What a Way to Explore!. North Andover, United States: BrickHouse Education
 Canetti, Y. (2014). Walk and Enjoy - Gregory's Farm Has Its Charm!. North Andover, United States: BrickHouse Education
 Canetti, Y. (2014). Walk and Enjoy - In Storyland, Joy is a Grand!. North Andover, United States: BrickHouse Education
 Canetti, Y. (2014). Walk and Enjoy - You Don't Need a Reason to Enjoy a Season!. North Andover, United States: BrickHouse Education
 Canetti, Y. (2003). Weather and Climate. Austin, United States: Steck-Vaughn Publishers
 Canetti, Y. (2009). What a Beautiful Sky. Boston, United States: Houghton Mifflin School
 Canetti, Y. (2014). What Smart Guys! Babies know A Lot!. North Andover, United States: BrickHouse Education
 Canetti, Y. (2014). What Smart Guys! Families Know A lot!. North Andover, United States: BrickHouse Education
 Canetti, Y. (2014). What Smart Guys! Friends Know A Lot!. North Andover, United States: BrickHouse Education
 Canetti, Y. (2014). What Smart Guys! Moms and Dads Know A Lot!. North Andover, United States: BrickHouse Education
 Canetti, Y. (2010). What They Can Do, We Can Too! Carry. North Andover, United States: BrickHouse Education
 Canetti, Y. (2010). What They Can Do, We Can Too! Catch. North Andover, United States: BrickHouse Education
 Canetti, Y. (2010). What They Can Do, We Can Too! Climb Down. North Andover, United States: BrickHouse Education
 Canetti, Y. (2010). What They Can Do, We Can Too! Climb Up. North Andover, United States: BrickHouse Education
 Canetti, Y. (2010). What They Can Do, We Can Too! Crawl. North Andover, United States: BrickHouse Education
 Canetti, Y. (2010). What They Can Do, We Can Too! Crouch. North Andover, United States: BrickHouse Education
 Canetti, Y. (2010). What They Can Do, We Can Too! Curl Up. North Andover, United States: BrickHouse Education
 Canetti, Y. (2010). What They Can Do, We Can Too! Dig. North Andover, United States: BrickHouse Education
 Canetti, Y. (2010). What They Can Do, We Can Too! Dive. North Andover, United States: BrickHouse Education
 Canetti, Y. (2010). What They Can Do, We Can Too! Fish. North Andover, United States: BrickHouse Education
 Canetti, Y. (2010). What They Can Do, We Can Too! Fly. North Andover, United States: BrickHouse Education
 Canetti, Y. (2010). What They Can Do, We Can Too! Go Up. North Andover, United States: BrickHouse Education
 Canetti, Y. (2010). What They Can Do, We Can Too! Grab. North Andover, United States: BrickHouse Education
 Canetti, Y. (2010). What They Can Do, We Can Too! Gymnastics. North Andover, United States: BrickHouse Education
 Canetti, Y. (2010). What They Can Do, We Can Too! Hide. North Andover, United States: BrickHouse Education
 Canetti, Y. (2010). What They Can Do, We Can Too! Illuminate. North Andover, United States: BrickHouse Education
 Canetti, Y. (2010). What They Can Do, We Can Too! Inflate. North Andover, United States: BrickHouse Education
 Canetti, Y. (2010). What They Can Do, We Can Too! Jump. North Andover, United States: BrickHouse Education
 Canetti, Y. (2010). What They Can Do, We Can Too! Launch. North Andover, United States: BrickHouse Education
 Canetti, Y. (2010). What They Can Do, We Can Too! Play. North Andover, United States: BrickHouse Education
 Canetti, Y. (2010). What They Can Do, We Can Too! Run. North Andover, United States: BrickHouse Education
 Canetti, Y. (2010). What They Can Do, We Can Too! See in the Dark. North Andover, United States: BrickHouse Education
 Canetti, Y. (2010). What They Can Do, We Can Too! Sit. North Andover, United States: BrickHouse Education
 Canetti, Y. (2010). What They Can Do, We Can Too! Stand on One Leg. North Andover, United States: BrickHouse Education
 Canetti, Y. (2010). What They Can Do, We Can Too! Stand Up. North Andover, United States: BrickHouse Education
 Canetti, Y. (2010). What They Can Do, We Can Too! Swim. North Andover, United States: BrickHouse Education
 Canetti, Y. (2014). What, Where, How, Why: HOW is it?. North Andover, United States: BrickHouse Education
 Canetti, Y. (2014). What, Where, How, Why: WHAT is it?. North Andover, United States: BrickHouse Education
 Canetti, Y. (2014). What, Where, How, Why: WHERE is it?. North Andover, United States: BrickHouse Education
 Canetti, Y. (2014). What, Where, How, Why: WHY it Happens?. North Andover, United States: BrickHouse Education
 Canetti, Y. (2010). When Times Are Tough (En tiempos difíciles). Lawrence, United States: Brickhouse Education
 Canetti, Y. (2009). Where Be Belong. New York, United States: Macmillan/McGraw-Hill
 Canetti, Y. (2014). Who Lives in the Farm?. North Andover, United States: BrickHouse Education
 Canetti, Y. (2014). Who Lives in the Forest?. North Andover, United States: BrickHouse Education
 Canetti, Y. (2014). Who Lives in the Garden?. North Andover, United States: BrickHouse Education
 Canetti, Y. (2014). Who Lives in the Sea?. North Andover, United States: BrickHouse Education
 Canetti, Y. (2014). Wild ABC's. North Andover, United States: BrickHouse Education
 Canetti, Y. (2019). Ya llega la primavera. North Andover, United States: BrickHouse Education
 Canetti, Y. (2008). Yayo en la playa. New York, United States: Macmillan/McGraw-Hill
 Canetti, Y. (2008). Yo puedo. New York, United States: Macmillan/McGraw-Hill
 Canetti, Y. (2017). Yo puedo ser la próxima presidenta. North Andover, United States: BrickHouse Education
 Canetti, Y. (2010). Yo también puedo ser presidente. North Andover, United States: BrickHouse Education
 Canetti, Y. (2014). Yo tengo un hermano pero…. North Andover, United States: BrickHouse Education
 Canetti, Y. (2008). Yo toco contigo. New York, United States: Macmillan/McGraw-Hill
 Canetti, Y. (2008). Yo veo. New York, United States: Macmillan/McGraw-Hill
 Canetti, Y. (2008). Yo vivo aquí. New York, United States: Macmillan/McGraw-Hill
 Canetti, Y. (2014). Yummy ABC's. North Andover, United States: BrickHouse Education
 Canetti, Y. The Bossy Rooster (version of the Cuban folktale). New York, United States: McMillan-McGraw-Hill
 Canetti, Y. (2008). Zorro y Caracol. New York, United States: Macmillan/McGraw-Hill
 Canetti, Y. (2020). Juego / In the Sky. New York, United States: Benchmark Education
 Canetti, Y. (2020). La niña nueva / The New Girl. New York, United States: Benchmark Education
 Canetti, Y. (2020). Gato pide un deseo / Cat Makes a Wish. New York, United States: Benchmark Education
 Canetti, Y. (2020). El taco de Paco / Paco's Taco. New York, United States: Benchmark Education
 Canetti, Y. (2020). Abuelo Manatí / Grandpa Manatee. New York, United States: Benchmark Education
 Canetti, Y. (2020). Agustín el bailarín  / The Dancer Agustín. New York, United States: Benchmark Education
 Canetti, Y. (2020). El pez que quería subir la montaña / The  Fish that Wanted to Climb the Mountain. New York, United States: Benchmark Education
 Canetti, Y. (2020). Beto al bate / Beto at Bat. New York, United States: Benchmark Education
 Canetti, Y. (2020). La hormiga, la ardilla, la mula y la montaña / Ant, Squirrel, Mule, and Mountain. New York, United States: Benchmark Education
 Canetti, Y. (2020). En cada estación, ¡qué diversión! / What Fun in Every Season!. New York, United States: Benchmark Education
 Canetti, Y. (2020). La lechuza que no dormía de día / The Owl That Didn't Sleep During the Day. New York, United States: Benchmark Education
 Canetti, Y. (2020). El baúl del ático / The Attic Trunk. New York, United States: Benchmark Education
 Canetti, Y. (2020). Fábula del burro que no tenía un pelo de tonto. / Fable of the Donkey Who Didn't Know. New York, United States: Benchmark Education

Translations

Curious George
 Rey, H. A. Jorge el curioso monta en bicicleta (2002)
 Rey, H. A. Jorge el curioso y el conejito (2002)
 Rey, H. A. Opuestos con Jorge el curioso (2002)
 Rey, H. A. Jorge el curioso encuentra trabajo (2003)
 Rey, H. A. Curious George Cleans Up / Jorge el curioso limpia el reguero (Bilingual Edition) (2007)
 Rey, H. A. Curious George Plants a Seed / Jorge el curioso siembra una semilla (Bilingual Edition) (2007)
 Rey, H. A. Curious George Piñata Party / Jorge el curioso y la piñata (Bilingual Edition) (2009)

Dr. Seuss
 Dr. Seuss.  ¡Cómo el Grinch robó la Navidad! [How the Grinch Stole Christmas!] (2000)
 Dr. Seuss. Horton escucha a Quién[Horton Hears a Who!] (2002)
 Dr. Seuss. El gato con sombrero viene de nuevo [The Cat in the Hat Comes Back] (2004)
 Dr. Seuss. Un pez, dos peces, pez rojo, pez azul [One Fish, Two Fish, Red Fish, Blue Fish] (2005)
 Dr. Seuss. ¡Puedo leer con los ojos cerrados! [I Can Read with My Eyes Shut!]  (2005, 2019)
 Dr. Seuss. Y pensar que lo vi en la calle porvenir [And to Think That I Saw It on Mulberry Street!] (2006)
 Dr. Seuss. ¡Hay un molillo en mi bolsillo! [There’s a Wocket in My Pocket] (2007)
 Dr. Seuss. Yoruga la tortuga, y otros cuentos [Yertle the Turtle and Other Stories](2009)
 Dr. Seuss. ¡Cuántos, cuántos pies! [The Foot Book] (2019)
 Dr. Seuss. ¡Diez manzanas en la cabeza! [Ten Apples Up on Top!] (2019)
 Dr. Seuss. ¡Dormilones! [Sleep Book] (2019)
 Dr. Seuss. Horton cuida un nido [Horton Hatches the Egg] (2019)
 Dr. Seuss. ¡El Sr. Brown hace Muuu! ¿Podrías hacerlo tú? [Mr. Brown Can Moo! Can You?] (2019)
 Dr. Seuss. ¡Feliz cumpleaños! [Happy Birthday to You!] (2019)
 Dr. Seuss. ¿Te he dicho alguna vez lo afortunado que eres? [Did I Ever Tell You How Lucky You Are?] (2020)
 Dr. Seuss. El pozo de Pascual [McElligot's Pool]  (2020)
 Dr. Seuss. Los Sneetches y otros cuentos [The Sneetches and Other Stories] (2020)
 Dr. Seuss. Rosita, cabeza de margarita [Daisy-Head Mayzie]  (2020)
 Dr. Seuss. Si yo fuera el director del circo [If I Ran the Circus]   (2020)

Other children's books
 Parish, Peggy. Amelia Bedelia (1996, 2000)
 Burton, Virginia Lee. Mike Mulligan y su máquina maravillosa (1997)
 Maguire, Arlene and Sheila Lucas. Todos somos especiales (1997-2005, 2007, 2008)
 Allard, Harry. ¡La Señorita Nelson ha desaparecido! (1998)
 Marshall, James. Jorge y Marta (2000)
 Lester, Helen. El pingüino Taky (2001)
 Walsh, Melanie. ¿Tienen rayas los cerditos? (2002)
 Walsh, Melanie. ¿Trinan los monos? (2002)
 Berenstain, Stan & Jan. Los osos Berenstain al rescate de la Navidad (2005)
 Ajmera, Maya and John D. Ivanko. Ser vecinos (2007)
 Cronin, Doreen. ¡A tu ritmo! (2007)
 Munsch, Robert. 50 grados bajo cero (2007)
 Munsch, Robert. Jonathan limpió...luego un ruido escuchó (2007)
 Munsch, Robert. Mortimer (2007)
 Munsch, Robert. La sorpresa del salón (2007)
 Bush, Laura & Jenna. ¡Leer para creer! (2008)

See also
 Cuban American literature
 List of Cuban-American writers

Sources

 Thiem, Annegret. "Al otro lado: Yanitzia Canetti entre la mística y el postmodernismo" Espéculo: Revista de estudios literarios. Universidad Complutense de Madrid. 2004.

External links
Yanitzia Canetti's reviews on newspapers and magazines
Yanitzia Canetti's official website
Yanitzia Canetti's Spanish bibliography on Lectorum
Yanitzia Canetti's bibliography on Amazon

1967 births
Living people
Writers from Havana
20th-century Cuban novelists
Cuban translators
American writers of Cuban descent
Cuban women novelists
20th-century Cuban women writers
21st-century Cuban novelists
21st-century Cuban women writers
Hispanic and Latino American writers
English–Spanish translators
Latin Americanists